Carl Gustav Thaulow (October 23, 1875 – May 30, 1942) was a Norwegian sailor who competed in the 1912 Summer Olympics. He was a crew member of the Norwegian boat Magda IX, which won the gold medal in the 12 metre class.

Carl Thaulow was a son of physician Johan Fredrik Thaulow.

References

External links
profile

1875 births
1942 deaths
Norwegian male sailors (sport)
Sailors at the 1912 Summer Olympics – 12 Metre
Olympic sailors of Norway
Olympic gold medalists for Norway
Olympic medalists in sailing
Medalists at the 1912 Summer Olympics